Go with Me is a 2008 novel by American writer Castle Freeman Jr. It is Castle Freeman's third novel and it was first published by Steerforth Press in January 2008.

Plot summary
This short novel of only 160 pages is set in backwoods Vermont where the local villain, Blackway, is making life hellish for Lillian, a young woman from outside the area. Her boyfriend has fled the state in fear, and local law enforcement can do nothing to protect her. She resolves to stand her ground, and to fight back. Lillian enlists the powerful brute Nate and the wily old-timer Lester to take the fight to her tormenter whilst an eccentric Greek chorus of locals ponders her likely fate.

Inspiration
The novel was inspired by Thomas Malory's King Arthur Tales, specifically "The Tale of Sir Gareth of Orkney".

Reception
The Wall Street Journal called it "a novel with echoes of Deliverance and Cormac McCarthy," and goes on to praise the author for capturing "the feel of played-out Vermont towns and people, his dialogue has a terse, almost humorous, cadence."
People agreed, writing that "Freeman has a flawless ear for dialogue and a sharp eye for quirky detail."
O: The Oprah Magazine called it an "elegant little thriller about cunning versus cruelty...This is a meticulous New England miniature, with not a wasted word."
The Boston Globe called it "a gem that sparkles with sly insight and cuts like a knife."
Matthew Lewin of The Guardian wrote, "This unusual little gem of a book is part comic romp and part nail-biting thriller" and concluded that "Castle Freeman writes with both wit and a deep understanding of the human psyche, and he does not cheat us out of a dramatic climax."

Adaptation

The 2016 film Blackway is based on the book.  The film was previously known as Go with Me and was released in some markets with that title.

References

External links

bookgroup.info: interview: Castle Freeman
A Chat with Castle Freeman, Jr
Interview: Castle Freeman, author of Go with Me

Editions
  Steerforth Press (First Edition, Hardback,  US, 2008)
  Harper Perennial (Paperback, US, 2008)
  Duckworth (Paperback, UK, 2008)

2008 American novels
Novels set in Vermont
American thriller novels
American novels adapted into films